Aerenicini is a tribe of longhorn beetles of the subfamily Lamiinae.

Taxonomy
 Aerenica Dejean, 1835
 Aerenicella Gilmour, 1962
 Aerenicopsis Bates, 1885
 Aereniphaula Galileo & Martins, 1990
 Aerenomera Gilmour, 1962
 Antodice Thomson, 1864
 Antodilanea Gilmour, 1962
 Aphilesthes Bates, 1881
 Apoaerenica Martins & Galileo, 1985
 Apophaula Lane, 1973
 Cacsius Lane, 1976
 Calliphaula Lane, 1973
 Eponina Lane, 1939
 Holoaerenica Lane, 1973
 Hoplistonychus Melzer, 1930
 Hydraschema Thomson, 1864
 Melzerella Costa Lima, 1931 
 Montesia Lane, 1938
 Paraphaula Fuchs, 1963
 Phaula Thomson, 1857
 Propantodice Franz, 1954
 Pseudomecas Aurivillius, 1920
 Pseudophaula Lane, 1973
 Recchia Lane, 1966
 Rumacon Blackwelder, 1946
 Suipinima Martins & Galileo, 2004
 Vianopolisia Lane, 1966

References

 
Lamiinae